The 1984 New Zealand rugby union tour of Australia was a series of fourteen rugby union matches played by the New Zealand national rugby union team (the All Blacks) in Australia in July and August 1984. The All Blacks won thirteen games and lost only the first of the three international matches against the Australia national rugby union team. It was the 25th tour of Australia by a New Zealand team.

The previous tour by the All Blacks in Australia was the 1980 tour, while Australia had visited New Zealand on their 1982 tour

The All Blacks won two test matches of three and retained the Bledisloe Cup which they had won in the 1982 series.

The tour 
Scores and results list New Zealand's points tally first.

Touring party

Manager: R. J. Littlejohn
Assistant manager (coach): Bryce Rope
Captain: Andy Dalton

Backs

Forwards

References

External links 
 New Zealand in Australia 1984 from rugbymuseum.co.nz

New Zealand
New Zealand tour
Australia tour
New Zealand national rugby union team tours of Australia